Anđelo Šetka (born 14 September 1985) is a Croatian water polo player. He was part of the Croatian team at the 2016 Summer Olympics, where the team won the silver medal.

See also
 Croatia men's Olympic water polo team records and statistics
 List of Olympic medalists in water polo (men)
 List of world champions in men's water polo
 List of World Aquatics Championships medalists in water polo

References

External links
 

1985 births
Living people
Water polo players from Split, Croatia
Croatian male water polo players
Water polo drivers
Water polo players at the 2016 Summer Olympics
Medalists at the 2016 Summer Olympics
Olympic silver medalists for Croatia in water polo
World Aquatics Championships medalists in water polo
Competitors at the 2013 Mediterranean Games
Mediterranean Games medalists in water polo
Mediterranean Games gold medalists for Croatia
Croatian expatriate sportspeople in Italy
Croatian expatriate sportspeople in Montenegro
Expatriate water polo players